Kampong Sungai Orok is a village in Brunei-Muara District, Brunei. The population was 1,025 in 2016. It is of the villages within Mukim Berakas 'B'. The postcode is BC1715.

References 

Sungai Orok